The 1862 Avon by-election was a by-election held on 11 June 1862 during the 3rd New Zealand Parliament in the Christchurch electorate of .

The by-election was caused by the resignation of the incumbent MP Alfred Richard Creyke.

The by-election was won by William Thomson. He was unopposed.

Notes

Avon 1862
1862 elections in New Zealand
Politics of Christchurch